Ole Eskild Dahlstrøm (born 4 March 1970 in Oslo, Norway) is a former professional Norwegian ice hockey player.

Playing career
Dahlstrøm broke onto the Norwegian hockey scene 1987/88 playing for Furuset. The following season, still as a junior aged player, he ended up on the IIHF Division 1 All Star team when he helped Norway to promotion for the 1990 IIHF World Championship in Switzerland.

He went to Örebro in the Swedish Division One for the 1988/89 season but came back to his native Furuset after only one season in Sweden. He then played three more seasons for Furuset before signing with Storhamar prior to the 1992/93 season. He scored five goals in his first game for Storhamar against Trondheim. In 527 games with Storhamar he scored 249 goals and 351 assists. Storhamar won five Norwegian Cups in that span. His Storhamar tenure was briefly interrupted when Dahlstrøm went to Adler Mannheim of Germany before the 1997/98 season. He also won the DEL championship that year.

He made the Norwegian All-Star team four times, and played 96 games for Team Norway. In 1996/97 he won the Norwegian Ice Hockey Federation's Golden Puck as the best Norwegian player of the year.

He was drafted by the Minnesota North Stars in 1990. He was selected in the 11th round (218th overall).

Career statistics

Post-retirement
Dahlstrøm is now head of player development operations within the Storhamar organisation as well as serving as an expert commentator for the Norwegian TV channel TV2.

References
 Storhamar Dragons alumni profile (in Norwegian)
 Player profile at Eurohockey.net
 Norwegian born players drafted by NHL teams

1970 births
Adler Mannheim players
Furuset Ishockey players
Ice hockey players at the 1992 Winter Olympics
Ice hockey players at the 1994 Winter Olympics
Lillehammer IK players
Living people
Minnesota North Stars draft picks
NIHF Golden Puck winners
Norwegian ice hockey coaches
Norwegian ice hockey centres
Olympic ice hockey players of Norway
Ice hockey people from Oslo
Storhamar Dragons coaches
Storhamar Dragons players